Oumar Tatam Ly (born 28 September 1963) is a Malian politician who was Prime Minister of Mali from 5 September 2013 to 5 April 2014. He was previously a special adviser at the Central Bank of West African States.

Early life and education
Oumar Tatam Ly was born in 1963 in Paris. His father was Ibrahima Ly, a political activist during Moussa Traoré's rule, and his mother was Madina Ly-Tall, who was an ambassador during Alpha Oumar Konaré's presidency. Tatum Ly holds a degree in economics from Panthéon-Sorbonne University and a Masters from ESSEC Business School. He also received a diploma from École normale supérieure de Lyon.

Career
Tatam Ly originally started working at the World Bank before moving to the Central Bank of West African States in 1994. During his career at the BCEAO, he was promoted from director of finance to special advisor.

Prime Minister
Tatam Ly was appointed as Prime Minister of Mali by President Ibrahim Boubacar Keïta on 5 September 2013, a day after Keïta was sworn in as President. After being swore in, Tatam Ly focused on achieving the President's promises of bringing the people of Mali together and ending Mali's systemic corruption. In order to fulfill Keita's promises, Tatam Ly created the post of Minister of Reconciliation and assigned the position to Cheick Ouamar Diarrah.

At the end of November 2013, his proposed visit to the northern city of Kidal and the consequent police repression of protests led to the MNLA aborting the ceasefire agreement.

Tatam Ly and his cabinet resigned on 5 April 2014. Moussa Mara was appointed to replace him on the same day.

References 

1963 births
Living people
Malian Muslims
Politicians from Paris
Prime Ministers of Mali
ESSEC Business School alumni
21st-century Malian people